The Aguacaliente Wildlife Sanctuary is a nature reserve in the Toledo District of southern Belize. The Sanctuary is critical for the preservation of biodiversity in Belize and the region. 
The National Park protects the central wetlands areas which consist of  three fresh water lagoons and a hot-spring connected by a number of creeks  hence the name Aguacaliente. It is co-managed by the Aguacaliente Management Team (AMT), a consortium of people from adjacent villages.

Notable Features
The lagoons are a feeding area for hundreds of waterfowl including wood storks, endangered jabiru storks, black-bellied whistling ducks, sandpipers, and others. Many of the birds use the sanctuary as a transmigration point during their seasonal journeys.
The Aguacaliente Wildlife Sanctuary plays an important role in flood control and water purification. The wetlands act as a filter for the Moho River Watershed, holding and cleansing runoff and floodwaters before they travel through adjacent villages to the Gulf of Honduras.
The forest and savanna areas of the Aguacaliente Wildlife Sanctuary provide habitat for a wide variety of animals including gibnuts|peccary, black howler monkeys, white-tailed deer, kinkajous, and endangered tapirs and jaguar.

See also
List of protected areas of Belize

References

External links
http://www.belizeit.com/aguacaliente-wildlife-sanctuary.html
http://biological-diversity.info/luha.htm
http://protectedplanet.net/301992
http://www.belizeexplorer.com/Belize-on-a-Budget/Aguacaliente-Wildlife-Sanctuary.html

Protected areas of Belize
Nature conservation in Belize
Toledo District
Protected areas established in 1998
1998 establishments in Belize